Ryan Klein (born 15 June 1997) is a South African cricketer who plays for the Netherlands.

Klein made his first-class debut on 17 October 2019, for Western Province in the 2019–20 CSA 3-Day Provincial Cup. He made his List A debut on 27 October 2019, for Western Province in the 2019–20 CSA Provincial One-Day Challenge.

Klein holds a Dutch passport, and in May 2021, Klein was named in Netherlands' A squad for their tour of Ireland. In January 2022, Klein was named in the Dutch One Day International (ODI) squad for their series against Afghanistan in Qatar. He made his ODI debut on 23 January 2022, for the Netherlands against Afghanistan. The following month, he was named in the Dutch Twenty20 International (T20I) squad for their tour of New Zealand. In August 2022, Klein was again named in the Dutch T20I squad, this time for a home series also against New Zealand. He made his T20I debut on 4 August 2022, for the Netherlands against New Zealand.

References

External links
 

1997 births
Living people
Dutch cricketers
Netherlands One Day International cricketers
Netherlands Twenty20 International cricketers
South African cricketers
Western Province cricketers
Cricketers from Cape Town